Byron is a city located primarily in Peach County, Georgia, United States. A small portion of the city also extends into parts of Houston and Crawford counties. The population was estimated to be 5,149 in 2019 by the Census Bureau, an increasing of 14.1% from 4,512 at the 2010 census. The city is in the Warner Robins Metropolitan Statistical Area.

Byron was home to the Middle Georgia Raceway, an auto racetrack that hosted NASCAR races and the filming of TV commercials and a feature movie. From July 3–5, 1970, in a field next to the raceway, the Atlanta International Pop Festival was held, which was the largest gathering in Georgia history until the 1996 Olympics in Atlanta. On September 15, 2012, an official Georgia Historical Society marker was placed near the raceway site to commemorate the festival.

History
The community was named after Lord Byron, the British Romantic poet. A former variant name was "Jackson", but the name was changed in order to avoid repetition with the Jackson in Butts County. The Georgia General Assembly incorporated the place as the "Town of Byron" in 1874.

Geography

Byron is located in the northeast corner of Peach County at  (32.648908, -83.755640), near the geographic center of Georgia. Interstate 75 passes through the eastern side of the city, with access from Exits 146 and 149 (Georgia State Route 49).

Demographics

2020 census

As of the 2020 United States census, there were 5,702 people, 2,198 households, and 1,588 families residing in the city.

2010 census
As of the 2010 Census the Census Bureau estimated there were 4,512 people and 1,781 households. The racial makeup of the city was 65.40% White, 29.03% African American, 0.18% Native American, 1.77% Asian, 0.04% Pacific Islander, 1.97% from other races, and 1.60% from two or more races. Hispanic or Latino of any race were 3.86% of the population.

There were 1,781 households, out of which 35.9% had children under the age of 18 living with them, 60.9% were married couples living together, 14.8% were family households with a female householder with no husband present, and 27.1% were non-families. 23.6% of all households were made up of individuals, and 10.9% had someone living alone who was 60 years of age or older. The average household size was 2.53 and the average family size was 2.99.

In the city, the populations' age spreads out among different cohorts, with 24.6% under the age of 18, 8.1% from 18 to 24, 29.3% from 25 to 44, 26.2% from 45 to 64, and 11.8% who were 65 years of age or older.  The median age was 36.9 years. For every 100 females, there were 91.8 males.

In 2019 the Census Bureau estimated the median household income to be $54,433 and the median income for a family as $70,347. Males had a median income of $62,785 versus $17,118 for females. The per capita income for the city was $28,964.  About 17.1% of families and 20.3% of the population were below the poverty line, including 28.7% of those under age 18 and 28.2% of those age 65 or over. Of those 25 years of age or older, 10.7% held less than a high school degree, 27.5% held a bachelor's degree or higher, and 61.8% held at least a high school degree.

Arts and culture
The city hosts the Battle of Byron, an annual charity fundraiser.

References

External links

 Byron Convention & Visitors Bureau

Cities in Georgia (U.S. state)
Cities in Peach County, Georgia
Cities in Houston County, Georgia